Bálint Karosi (born 1979 in Budapest, Hungary) is a Hungarian organist and composer.

Karosi is a concert organist, composer and advocate of the art of keyboard improvisation in historic styles. He has appeared as a soloist at the Gewandhaus in Leipzig, the Béla Bartók National concert Hall in Budapest, the Rudolfinum in Prague, the Liszt Academy in Budapest, the Victoria Hall in Geneva and the Essen Philarmonie, and has been a soloist at the Baldwin Wallace Bach Festival, the International Bach Festival in Leipzig, the Boston Early Music Festival and the Magadino Organ Festival in Switzerland. He has performed in historic venues such as the Thomaskirche in Leipzig, the Marienkirche in Lübeck, the Cathedrals in Speyer, Geneva, Freiberg, St. Albans and at Christ Church in Dublin. He has released three CDs by Hungaroton, Dorian and Dulcian labels.

Mr. Karosi captured media attention when he became the first American-based organist to win the International Bach Competition in Leipzig, Germany. He also won first prize and audience prize at the Dublin International Organ Competition, the Miami International Competition, the Arthur Poister Organ Competition in Syracuse, and second prize at the American Guild of Organist’s National Young Artist Competition and the St. Maurice d’Agaune Competition in Switzerland.

Balint Karosi’s compositions include chamber music, cantatas, art songs, works for the organ and sacred and orchestral music. He was commissioned recently by the Boston Modern Orchestra Project for Existentia in memoriam Sándor Weöres, for symphony orchestra, to be premiered January, 2015. His Triple Concerto for Harp, Guitar and Cimbalom is scheduled for a performance in April, 2015 in Budapest by Musicians Libres. The Hungarian State Opera has commissioned an overture for orchestra to be premiered in 2016. His Concerto for Organ and Symphony Orchestra, commissioned by the National Concert Hall in Budapest was premiered in 2007 by the Miskolc Symphony Orchestra with the composer as soloist. The performance was subsequently broadcast on NPR’s Pipedreams. His Orpheus’ Harp, a solo cantata for tenor, harp, organ, violin and percussion, based on a poem by Czeszław Miłosz was premiered at the National Concert Hall in Budapest in 2010 by the acclaimed Hungarian tenor, Szabolcs Brickner, violinist Kristóf Baráti with László Fassang as organist.

In 2013-2014 He has collaborated with poet Kai Hoffmann-Krull in two cantatas for choir, orchestra and soloists: Lines of a Page, commissioned by the Norfolk Chamber Music Festival, and Words of Beginning, written for the 175th anniversary of the First Lutheran Church of Boston. He is currently collaborating with the acclaimed stage director and librettist András Almási-Tóth to write an opera based on a Hungarian folk tale. His song cycle Poems of the Night, and his Dancescapes for symphony orchestra has earned him the Charles Ives Scholarship from the American Academy of Arts and Letters.  He is also the recipient of the Hungarian Junior Prima Prize.

A devoted teacher of organ, improvisation and music theory, Mr. Karosi has taught at Boston University and UMass Boston, the Oberlin Conservatory and the Yale Department of Music. He has been an advocate of the art of keyboard improvisation since he started playing the organ at age seventeen. His doctoral thesis Rhetoric and Schemata: Improvising the Chorale Prelude in the 18th-century Lutheran Tradition investigates the pedagogical, cultural and methodological role of the Lutheran Chorales in teaching improvisation in the eighteenth century.

Karosi has completed the academic portion of his doctoral studies at the Yale School of Music. He earned Master’s degrees from the Yale School of Music, the Oberlin Conservatory, the Liszt Academy in Budapest, and a Prix de Virtuosité from the Conservatoire Supérieur de Genève. He is under management with Penny Lorenz Artist Management.

References

Schemata and Rhetoric: Improvising the Chorale Prelude in the Eighteenth-Century Lutheran Tradition.

External links
 Artist's Website
 Bálint Karosi's Youtube channel
 BWV546

1979 births
Living people
Musicians from Budapest
Hungarian musicians
Franz Liszt Academy of Music alumni